The 1976–77 Buffalo Sabres season was the Sabres' seventh season in the National Hockey League (NHL).

Offseason

Regular season

Final standings

Schedule and results

Playoffs

Preliminary Round vs. Minnesota North Stars 

Game 1: Minnesota 2 Buffalo 4

Game 2: Buffalo 7 Minnesota 1

Buffalo wins series 2-0

Quarterfinals vs. New York Islanders 

Game 1: Buffalo 2 New York 4

Game 2: Buffalo 2 New York 4

Game 3: New York 4 Buffalo 3

Game 4: New York 4 Buffalo 3

New York wins series 4-0

Player statistics

Awards and records

Transactions

Draft picks
Buffalo's draft picks at the 1976 NHL Amateur Draft held in Montreal, Quebec.

Farm teams

See also
1976–77 NHL season

References

Buffalo Sabres seasons
Buffalo
Buffalo
Buffalo
Buffalo